Samu Volotinen (born 26 August 1998) is a Finnish professional footballer who plays for IF Gnistan as a goalkeeper.

Career
Volotinen spent his early career in Finland with PK-35 Vantaa and VPS. In December 2018 he signed for Bosnian club Čelik Zenica. The deal was officially confirmed on 12 January 2019. On 20 February 2019 the club announced that Volotinen would not be part of the registered squad due to the Bosnian league's restrictions on the number of foreign players, and they instead planned to bring foreign players to other positions.

In June 2019 he signed for Cypriot First Division club Apollon Limassol.

In January 2021 he returned to Finland, signing with IF Gnistan, signing a new contract with the club in December 2021.

References

1998 births
Living people
Finnish footballers
PK-35 Vantaa (men) players
Vaasan Palloseura players
NK Čelik Zenica players
Veikkausliiga players
Association football goalkeepers
Finnish expatriate footballers
Finnish expatriate sportspeople in Bosnia and Herzegovina
Expatriate footballers in Bosnia and Herzegovina
Finnish expatriate sportspeople in Cyprus
Expatriate footballers in Cyprus
Apollon Limassol FC players
IF Gnistan players
Sportspeople from Vantaa